The Intermountain Institute in Weiser, Idaho, also known as the Idaho Industrial Institute, was a school which included facilities for students boarding there.  Its complex of buildings are unusual in being constructed of continuously cast concrete during a span of about 20 years.

The complex includes nine buildings and a structure which were deemed contributing in a National Register of Historic Places listing in 1979.

It includes the Billings Memorial Gymnasium (1929), which was designed by Boise architects Tourtellotte & Hummel in Classical Revival style.

Hooker Hall is, architecturally, the "most pretentious" of the buildings;  plans were afoot in 1979 for it to become home of something.  In fact in 2019 it is the home of the Snake River Heritage Center and/or the Weiser Museum.

Location: Paddock Ave.

Year of construction: 1907
Historic function: Education
Historic subfunction: School; Educational Related Housing
Criteria: architecture/engineering, person

References

External links

ID
Schools in Idaho
National Register of Historic Places in Washington County, Idaho
Neoclassical architecture in Idaho
Buildings and structures completed in 1907